Fevang is a residential- and statistical area (grunnkrets) in Sandefjord municipality, Norway.

The statistical area Fevang, which also can include the peripheral parts of the village as well as the surrounding countryside, has a population of 324.

Fevang is located between Fokserød in the south and Rørkoll in the north. It is considered a part of the urban settlement Sandefjord, which covers the greater Sandefjord city area and stretches towards Stokke and into peripheral parts of Larvik municipality. The urban settlement Sandefjord has a population of 39,849, of which 39,144 people live within Sandefjord.

References

Villages in Vestfold og Telemark